Dervla McTiernan (born c.1977) is an Irish crime novelist.

Biography
Dervla McTiernan was born c.1977 in County Cork, growing up initially in Carrigaline and Douglas before her father's work in the bank took her to Dublin, aged six, and then Limerick. She came from a family of seven. McTiernan studied corporate law in University College Galway and went on to become a solicitor, training in Dublin. She returned to Galway, to Oranmore to build her own practice, working in it for about twelve years. By then she was married to her husband Kenny, an engineer. They had a daughter, with a son on the way. Ireland hit a recession and the couple moved to Australia. They settled in Perth, Western Australia, where McTiernan got a job working with the Mental Health Commission.

In 2014 she decided to give writing a serious try. Her first novel was published in 2018. It won the 2019 Davitt Award best novel, the Barry Award for the best paperback book, and the 2019 Ned Kelly Award for the best first novel. The book was also shortlisted for The Guardian's Not the Booker prize.

The Scholar won the Best Paperback Original Novel in the 2020 International Thriller Writers Awards. It was also shortlisted for the 2020 Davitt Award for best adult crime novel and the 2020 Ned Kelly Award for best crime fiction.

Her first novel is being adapted for film by Irish actor Colin Farrell and his production company.

The Good Turn was shortlisted for the 2021 General fiction book of the year at the Australian Book Industry Awards

Bibliography
The Ruin (2018)
The Scholar (2019)
The Good Turn (2020)
The Murder Rule (2022)

References and sources

Living people
People from County Cork
Irish women novelists
People from Galway (city)
People from Perth, Western Australia
21st-century Irish novelists
21st-century Irish women writers
Irish expatriates in Australia
Irish crime fiction writers
Women crime fiction writers
Alumni of the University of Galway
Barry Award winners
Year of birth missing (living people)